The Treaty of Ankara (1926), also known as The Frontier Treaty of 1926, was signed 5 June 1926 in Ankara by Turkey, United Kingdom and Mandatory Iraq. The treaty aimed to solve the so-called "The Mosul question" by determining a mutually satisfactory borders between Turkey and Iraq and to regulate their neighbourly relations. One important aspect of the treaty was that Turkey would have the right to engage in militarily conflict in the border region in the event of it being destabilised. This sphere of influence which is beyond Turkey's modern boundaries mainly covers northern part of Iraq, notably the Mosul and Kirkuk region.

Terms 
 Mosul Province would belong to Iraq.
 The "Brussel Line", as adopted previously on 29 October 1924 the provisional border, would act as the border between Turkey and Iraq.
 10% of the oil revenues from Mosul, Iraq  would be given to Turkey for 25 years.
 Turkey had received the payment for 4 years and would give up on the remaining 21 years of payment in favour of a payment of £500,000 sterling from the United Kingdom.

Aftermath 
"After the 1926 Treaty, relations between Turkey and Iraq gradually started to improve. In 1928, each side opened legations in the other's capitals and both countries presented their credentials. King Faisal and his ministers made a state visit to the Turkish capital in July 1931, and early in 1932, The Turco-Iraqi Treaties of Residence, Commerce, and Extradition was signed. Although, The Treaty of Bilateral Commerce and Friendship was signed between the Turkish and Iraqi governments in 1932, it was not approved by Britain, which shows the continuation of British control over Iraqi foreign policy after the mandate. In 1937, a non-aggression Treaty was signed with Iraq, called the Saadabad Pact."

See also
Iraq–Turkey relations
 Treaty of Saadabad - A five-year Non-aggression pact signed between Turkey, Iraq, Iran and Afghanistan on July 8, 1937.

References 

Iraq–Turkey relations
Treaties of Turkey
Treaties of Mandatory Iraq
Treaties of the United Kingdom
1926 treaties
1926 in Turkey
1926 in Iraq
Boundary treaties
History of Mosul
20th century in Ankara